Mfon is a common Ibibio given name. Notable people with the name include:

 Mfon Ekpo, Nigerian entrepreneur and author
 Mfon Udoh, Nigerian footballer
 Mfon Udoka, basketball player

See also
 Fon (title), sometimes spelled 'mfon', a chieftain or king of a region of Cameroon
 MegaFon, a phone operator with the stock symbol MFON